Brian Dooley (born 16 April 1971) is an English television writer.

He is best known for creating the sitcom The Smoking Room, which debuted on BBC Three in 2004, before it was transferred to BBC Two, and for which he received a BAFTA in 2005. He also appears in the series as Ben (from the post room).

Education
He was educated at Fitzwilliam College, Cambridge University.

Career
In 2007, Dooley contributed to the Doctor Who short story collection Short Trips: Snapshots. It was announced in Doctor Who Magazine issue 406 that he would write two episodes of series 3 of the Doctor Who spin-off The Sarah Jane Adventures, but his script, which formed the basis of Mona Lisa's Revenge, was rewritten to the extent that only Phil Ford was credited.

Other credits include Monkey Dust, The Sketch Show, Being Human and its IPlayer spin-off Becoming Human and plays for Radio Four.

References

External links
 
 BBC questions and answers with Dooley 

1971 births
Living people
Alumni of Fitzwilliam College, Cambridge
British television producers
British television writers
English television writers
English screenwriters
English male screenwriters
British male television writers
People from Crosby, Merseyside
21st-century British screenwriters
21st-century English male writers